The Battle of Whitney Avenue refers to the college ice hockey series between Quinnipiac Bobcats and Yale Bulldogs, both currently members of ECAC.

History

In 2006, the Quinnipiac Bobcats moved to the ECAC. Since then, Quinnipiac and the Yale Bulldogs have become one of biggest non-Ivy rivalries in the ECAC. The rivalry got its name from the fact that the two campuses are separated by a mere eight miles on Whitney Avenue from Hamden to New Haven.

The two teams met on April 13, 2013 for the fourth time in the 2012–13 season in Pittsburgh to play for the national championship. Although Quinnipiac had won the previous three meetings (all in the 2012–13 season) by a combined score of 13–3, Yale shut them out in the 2013 NCAA Division I Men's Ice Hockey National Championship Game, 4–0.

Game Results

Series facts

See also
 College rivalry
 Quinnipiac Bobcats
Yale Bulldogs

References

Quinnipiac Bobcats
Yale Bulldogs
College sports rivalries in the United States
College ice hockey rivalries in the United States
Yale Bulldogs men's ice hockey
Quinnipiac Bobcats men's ice hockey
2006 establishments in Connecticut
Recurring sporting events established in 2006